Château d'Enghien is a château in Enghien, Wallonia, Belgium. The current château dates from 1913.

Before that, there were two other structures in its place. One was razed due to disrepair. The Duke Louis-Engelbert built another building in its stead. It caught fire on his inauguration day. The current building was built in 1913 on the request of Baron .

See also
Baron Empain Palace (1911) in Cairo, Egypt

External links

 Official Web page of the municipality of Enghien

Châteaux
Castles in Hainaut (province)
Château d'Enghien